Charles Carroll Colby,  (December 10, 1827 – January 10, 1907) was a Canadian lawyer, businessman and politician.

He was born in Derby, Vermont in 1827, the son of Moses French Colby, and came to Stanstead, Quebec with his family in 1832. He studied at Dartmouth College in New Hampshire. He studied law, was called to the Quebec bar in 1855 and entered practice at Stanstead. In 1858, he married Harriet Child. Colby was elected as a Liberal-Conservative MP in the House of Commons of Canada in 1867 representing Stanstead and remained in parliament until his defeat in 1891. He served as President of the Privy Council under Sir John A. Macdonald from 1889 to 1891 and was previously Deputy Speaker and Chairman of Committees of the Whole of the House of Commons. Colby supported the introduction of tariffs to reciprocate against those imposed by the United States. He was a trustee of Stanstead College and a director for several railway companies. Colby served as vice-president of the Quebec Temperance and Prohibitory League.

Colby was the author of Parliamentary government in Canada, published in Montreal in 1886. He died in Montreal at the age of 79.

In 1859, Colby built Carrollcroft, his residence at Stanstead, which now serves as the site of the Colby-Curtis Museum.

Electoral record

References

External links
The Colbys of Stanstead
The Colbys of Stanstead - Charles Carroll Colby

1827 births
1907 deaths
Conservative Party of Canada (1867–1942) MPs
Members of the House of Commons of Canada from Quebec
Members of the King's Privy Council for Canada
People from Derby, Vermont